Relations between the Holy See and the Republic of China (today commonly known as Taiwan) were established on a non-diplomatic level in 1922 and at a diplomatic level in 1942. The Holy See recognizes the Republic of China as the representative of China.

History
Agreement to establish diplomatic relations between the Holy See and the Republic of China was reached in 1917. However, this move was blocked by France, which by the treaties imposed on China at the end of the Second Opium War held a "protectorate" over the Catholic missions in the country.

In 1922, Archbishop Celso Benigno Luigi Costantini was appointed to head an Apostolic Delegation in the country. Though Archbishop Costantini did not have diplomatic status, the Chinese government gave him the same honours as those granted to the diplomatic corps accredited to China at the funeral of Sun Yat-sen in 1925. Archbishop Costantini left China in 1933 and was succeeded by Archbishop Mario Zanin, who likewise was given all the honours reserved for Ministers Plenipotentiary.

Diplomatic relations were finally established on 23 October 1942 and, with the presentation by Archbishop Antonio Riberi of his letter of credence to the President in 1946, the Holy See's Apostolic Delegation in China gained diplomatic status.
 
There was a period of confusion after the Republic of China government moved in 1949 to Taipei on the island of Taiwan, to which Japan renounced all rights, title and claims three years later in Treaty of San Francisco. Although many diplomatic missions followed the government to Taipei, the Holy See's mission remained on the mainland and sought contact with the new Communist regime, the People's Republic of China, which did not accept Riberi as a diplomat and, in 1951, expelled him (see the Death of Antonio Riva). In the following year, the Holy See, having been rejected by the Beijing government, resumed relations with the previous (Nationalist) government, which after its defeat on the mainland had moved to Taipei and continued to claim to represent all of China under the name of "Republic of China", as before.

The United Nations continued to recognize the Taipei-based government as that of China until 25 October 1971. On that date, the seat of charter member of the United Nations and permanent member of the Security Council, China, passed to the Beijing government (PRC). While the Holy See still fully recognised the ROC, it did, however, take account of the altered situation by moving the nuncio – who had represented the Holy See in Taipei – to a new post; chargé d'affaires. By not appointing a successor for the post of nuncio, its mission in Taipei has since then been headed only by a chargé d'affaires. The Taipei government has made no change in the status of the embassy to the Holy See that it maintains in Rome.

On 8 April 2005, President Chen Shui-bian represented China and attended the funeral of Pope John Paul II. In March 2013, President Ma Ying-jeou visited Vatican City to attend the inauguration of Pope Francis. However, no pope—even John Paul II, by far the most-traveled pope—has ever visited the areas controlled by the Republic of China government.

As is usual for countries which maintain diplomatic relations with ROC, the Holy See in diplomacy recognises the Republic of China government as the government of China. As a result, when arranged alphabetically with other heads of state in Vatican ceremonies, ROC presidents are arranged under "Chine", French for "China" (French being the diplomatic language of the Holy See).

The Holy See maintains negotiations with the PRC for recognition however the Holy See has given the ROC assurances that any negotiations with the PRC will not come at the expense of their relations with the ROC.

On 19 February 2021, Pope Francis granted a decree of Canonical Coronation for a Marian image decreed as Madonna and Child with similar iconography with the alleged apparition in China, presently venerated in Chiayi, Taiwan. An official name of the image has not yet been designated by the Roman Catholic leadership in Taiwan. The date for coronation is yet to be announced.

Gallery

See also 
Apostolic Nunciature to China
Embassy of the Republic of China to the Holy See
Foreign relations of the Holy See
Foreign relations of the Republic of China
Roman Catholicism in China
Chinese Catholic Bishops Conference
China–Holy See relations
Fu Jen Catholic University

References

Taiwan
Bilateral relations of Taiwan